Certain time periods have been named "golden ages" where development in the Indian subcontinent flourished.

Ancient India

Gupta Empire
The period between the 4th and 6th centuries CE is known as the Golden Age of India because of the considerable achievements that in the fields of mathematics, astronomy, science, religion and philosophy during the Gupta Empire. The decimal numeral system, including the concept of zero, was invented in India during this period. The peace and prosperity created under the leadership of the Guptas enabled the pursuit of scientific and artistic endeavors in India. The Golden Age of India came to an end when the Hunas invaded the Gupta Empire in the 6th century CE. The gross domestic product (GDP) of ancient India was estimated to be 32% and 28% of the global GDP in 1 AD and 1000 AD respectively. Also, during the first millennium of common era the Indian population comprised around 30.3% and 27.15% of the total world population.

Medieval India

Chola Empire
South India in the 10th and 11th century CE under the imperial Cholas is considered as another Golden Age. The period saw extensive achievements in architecture, Tamil literature, sculpture and bronze working, maritime conquests and trade. During Cholas the major South East Asian countries practiced Hinduism, Chola’s influence was as far as Vietnam. Chola GDP constituted the world's largest GDP at that time.

References

External links
 Gupta and Harsha: The Classical Age
 Frontline Article on Gupta period Art

Ancient India
India